Dunning is a Scottish or Irish surname. A variant of Downing.

Notable people with the surname include:

Brian Dunning (cricketer) (1940–2008), New Zealand cricketer
Brian Dunning (flautist) (born 1952), Irish jazz flute player
Brian Dunning (author) (born 1965), American writer, producer and podcast host
Charles T. Dunning (1843–1916), Clerk of the New York State Senate
Charles Avery Dunning (1885–1958), Canadian businessman, politician and university chancellor
Charles Dunning (rugby) (died 1955), rugby league player
Chester Dunning, Texas historian and specialist in Russian studies
Dane Dunning (born 1994), American baseball player
Darren Dunning (born 1981), English footballer
David Dunning, American social psychologist 
Debbe Dunning (born 1966), American actress
Edwin Harris Dunning (1892–1917), British naval pilot, first to land an aircraft on a moving ship
Eric Dunning (1936–2019), British sociologist
George Dunning (1920–1979), British animator
Henry Dunning Moore (1817–1887), American politician
Henry Dunning Macleod (1821–1902), Scottish economist
Jack Dunning (1903–1971), New Zealand cricketer
Jake Dunning (born 1988), American baseball player
Jeanne Dunning (born 1960), American photographer
John Dunning (disambiguation), several people
Matt Dunning (born 1978), Canadian rugby union player who played for Australia
Nick Dunning (born 1959), English actor
Paris C. Dunning (1806–1884), American politician, governor of Indiana
Philo Dunning (1819–1900), American businessman and politician
Steve Dunning (born 1949), American baseball player
Thomas Dunning (1799–1873), English trade unionist
William Archibald Dunning (1857–1922), American historian and political scientist for whom the Dunning School of Reconstruction historiography is named
Willie Dunning (1865–1902), Scottish footballer